The Professional Indoor Football League (PIFL) was the second league to successfully play indoor football as a paid pro-league sport, after the Arena Football League (AFL).  Since the AFL had a patent given in 1990 on the gameplay of "Arena Football" (mainly the endzone nets), the PIFL played with mostly the same rules, but without the endzone nets. The PIFL only lasted one season (1998) under that name.

History
The PIFL was started by Richard "Dick" Suess. Suess was deeply involved in football on the semi-pro and minor league level, and was editor–publisher of the Minor League Football News. In 1996, he began shopping around the idea of the PIFL, an indoor league created from the top minor league programs around the country. The league was finally formed in late 1997 and began its first season in 1998. The league offices were located in Las Vegas, Nevada.

The PIFL was rife with problems from the start. The Colorado Wildcats changed coaches during the preseason. By the third game, many teams were in serious financial trouble and started forfeiting games. The Minnesota Monsters folded after Week 5. Many other teams missed payrolls and this resulted in many players, including some of the best players, quitting.

In 1999, the PIFL essentially "split" into two leagues.  Keary Ecklund, owner of the Green Bay Bombers and Madison Mad Dogs, took his two teams and form the Indoor Football League.  On January 4, 1999, the remaining teams of the PIFL renamed the league to the Indoor Professional Football League.

1998 PIFL season

Teams

Standings

 Minnesota folded after starting 1-4 on the season. PF/PA are for four official games actually played; the other game, which was Minnesota's lone victory, was ruled a forfeit awarded to Honolulu and the points were not counted in standings.
 Texas folded after starting 2-8 on the season. PF/PA are for nine games played.
 Utah forfeited their last game of the season to Madison. PF/PA are for 13 games played.
 Win totals for other teams include seven forfeited games by Minnesota and three forfeited games by Texas.
 Standings do not include exhibition games played by any of the teams.

Playoffs
August 7, 1998 — # 3 Green Bay Bombers 19 at # 2 Madison Mad Dogs 46

August 9, 1998 — # 4 Colorado Wildcats* 51 at # 1 Louisiana Bayou Beast 67 (at Riverside Centroplex)
 Colorado's trip to Louisiana was paid for by the owners of the Bayou Beast.

Championship Game
August 15, 1998 — #2 Madison Mad Dogs 41 at #1 Louisiana Bayou Beast 42 (at Pete Maravich Assembly Center)

Award winners
Following the championship game, the Professional Indoor Football League held an on-the-field awards ceremony. Those honored were as follows:

Most Valuable Player – Melvin Hill, QB, Louisiana Bayou Beast
Offensive Player of the Year – Jay McDonagh, QB, Green Bay Bombers
Defensive Player of the Year - Derric Coakley, DE, Green Bay Bombers
Coach of the Year – Buford Jordan, Louisiana Bayou Beast
Executive of the Year – James Shiver, Sr., Louisiana Bayou Beast

The Professional Indoor Football League earlier announced its 1998 All-Star teams as chosen by the PIFL coaches. The Green Bay Bombers lead the list with five first team selections, including top vote getter quarterback Jay McDonagh. He was joined on the offensive first team by teammates Chris Perry and Heath Garland (both receivers), Louisiana's Michael Lewis (WR), Chris Cloud (center) and Matt Huerkamp (kicker), Colorado's Rob Satterly (offensive line) and Utah's Matt Meservy (OL). Green Bay, Colorado and Madison each placed a pair of players on the defensive first team.

All-Stars

First Team
Offense
QB Jay McDonagh, Green Bay
RB Darnell Brooks, Colorado
WR Heath Garland, Green Bay
WR Michael Lewis, Louisiana
WR Chris Perry, Green Bay
OL Matt Meservey, Utah
OL Rob Satterly, Colorado
C  Chris Cloud, Louisiana
K  Matt Huerkamp, Louisiana
Defense
LB  James Gillyard, Louisiana
LB  Jeff Veronie, Colorado
S   Nick Galbreath, Colorado
DB  Ryan Buchanon, Madison
DB  Derf Reese, Green Bay
DE  Derric Coakley, Green Bay
DE  Tawain Temple, Madison
NT  Junior Fonoti, Utah
Second Team
Offense
QB  Mike Tillis, Honolulu
RB  Byron Allen, Louisiana
WR  Antonio Chandler, Colorado
WR  Greg Hooks, Utah
WR  Kahn Powell, Madison
OL  Jim Hobbins, Green Bay
C   Andy Ramos, Honolulu
K   Bryan Mader, Green Bay
Defense
LB  Joshua Jardine, Honolulu
LB  Pat Rogers, Louisiana
S   Jack Phillips, Louisiana
DB  Keith Ballard, Louisiana
DB  Falinko Vitale, Honolulu
NT  Kale Cockett, Honolulu
DE  Charles Johnson, Louisiana
DE  Franklin Thomas, Louisiana
Honorable Mention
Offense
QB  Melvin Hill, Louisiana
RB  Willie High, Green Bay
RB  Darnell Jones, Honolulu
WR  Lee McCormick, Texas
OL  Brandon Bergstresser, Madison
OL  Curtis Jones, Utah
C   Carl Silva, Utah
K   Doug Beach, Utah
Defense
LB  Junior Tagaloa, Utah
LB  Jose Salcido, Madison
S   Nick McDaniel, Utah
DB  Damon Jackson, Colorado
DB  Jesse Tann, Colorado
NT  David Cunningham, Madison
DE  Jeff Warner, Madison
DE  Norm Barnett, Colorado

Lawsuit with the Arena Football League

In February 1998, the Arena Football League sued the PIFL for allegedly infringing its trademarks, copyrights and patent. The PIFL answered and denied the Arena Football League's allegations. Late in June 1998, the Arena Football League filed a Motion for Preliminary Injunction before Judge Harry Leinenweber in Federal Court in the Northern District of Illinois. The Motion was set for hearing on July 21, 1998. On July 20, 1998, the PIFL and its league members filed their response, which included video tapes and other evidence refuting the Arena Football League's allegations. On July 22, 1998, the day after receiving the PIFL's legal papers, the Arena Football League withdrew its Motion for Preliminary Injunction in a lawsuit in Federal Court in Chicago. This ended the Arena Football League's efforts to challenge the practices of any competing professional "indoor" football league and clarified that its patent essentially applied to its end zone rebound nets, not any and all efforts to play American football indoors.

On November 12, 1998, The Professional Indoor Football League (PIFL) and the Arena Football League reached a settlement agreement in the lawsuit brought by the Arena Football League against the PIFL for patent infringement. As part of the settlement, all present and future PIFL teams have agreed to honor the patents, trademarks, copyrights and net structure of the Arena Football League, and in return the Arena Football League has withdrawn its motion to seek a restraining order to prevent the PIFL from playing its games. Additionally, the PIFL has agreed to use the following disclaimer, "PIFL and its teams are not affiliated, sponsored or associated with the Arena Football League or any of its member teams", on all official publications. Professional Indoor Football League Commissioner Mike Storen stated, "The Professional Indoor Football League is happy to acknowledge the uniqueness of the Arena Football League's patented net system and method of play on the basis that this settlement will allow the Professional Indoor Football League to expand in an orderly fashion."

PIFL European Division
The PIFL proposed European Division was set to kick off in November 1998 with teams in England and Ireland. A six-team tournament was planned for August 22, 1998 in Manchester, England. Terry Smith was the PIFL European League Director and was the head coach of the Great Britain Spartans. The Spartans were a very successful European minor American football club, trying to move up to the pro level. The Spartans played two exhibition games in the US on April 27, 1998, at the Madison Mad Dogs and on April 29, 1998, at the Green Bay Bombers. They lost both games, 12–29 to Madison and 34–55 to Green Bay.  The proposed European Division never started play.

Defunct indoor American football leagues in the United States
Sports leagues established in 1997
Organizations disestablished in 1998
1998 in American football